Authomaema diemeniana is a species of moth of the family Tortricidae. It is found in Australia, where it has been recorded from Tasmania and New South Wales.

Adults are slaty-fuscous, with the head, thorax, and basal third of the forewings pale yellow.

References

Moths described in 1877
Archipini
Moths of Australia